The Turks in the Czech Republic refers to ethnic Turkish migrants to the Czech Republic as well as the growing Czech-born community with full or partial Turkish origins. The majority of the Turkish community have come from the Republic of Turkey; however, there has also been ethnic Turkish migration from other post-Ottoman countries, particularly Turkish Macedonians from North Macedonia.

History
Traditionally, the Czech Republic was not the most popular choice of migration for Turkish people who mostly went to neighboring Austria and Germany. By the 2010s, international migration became a relatively new phenomenon for the Czech Republic and it gradually become a destination country due to its positive economic performance and political stability. Consequently, Turks seeking better economic opportunities have been drawn to the country, whilst many have also migrated to undertake their higher education in Czech universities. Turks who have decided to remain permanently in the Czech Republic have also brought their families over which has contributed to the increasing population.

Areas of settlement 
The Turkish community have settled mostly in the largest and most diverse urban centers with low unemployment rates.

Politics
In regards to Turkish politics, the Turkish community in the Czech Republic mostly support the main Turkish opposition party, the Republican People's Party, therefore, there is only low support for Recep Tayyip Erdoğan's Justice and Development Party.

Notable people
Murat Saygıner, digital artist, filmmaker and composer

See also 
Islam in the Czech Republic
Turks in Europe
Turks in Austria
Turks in Germany
Turks in Poland

References

Ethnic groups in the Czech Republic
Czech Republic
Czech Republic